The Defense Threat Reduction Agency (DTRA) is a combat support agency within the United States Department of Defense (DoD) for countering weapons of mass destruction (WMD; chemical, biological, radiological, nuclear, and high explosives). According to the agency's Strategic Plan for Fiscal Years 2018 to 2022, the DTRA mission "enables DoD and the U.S. Government to prepare for and combat weapons of mass destruction and improvised threats and to ensure nuclear deterrence." The agency is headquartered in Fort Belvoir, Virginia.

Organizational history
DTRA was officially established on October 1, 1998, as a result of the 1997 Defense Reform Initiative, by consolidating several DoD organizations, including the Defense Special Weapons Agency (successor to the Defense Nuclear Agency) and the On-Site Inspection Agency. The Defense Technology Security Administration and the Nunn–Lugar Cooperative Threat Reduction program office in the Office of the Secretary of Defense were also incorporated into the new agency.

In 2002, DTRA published a detailed history of its predecessor agencies, Defense's Nuclear Agency, 1947–1997, the first paragraph of which makes a brief statement about the agencies which led up to the formation of DTRA:

Defense's Nuclear Agency, 1947–1997, traces the development of the Armed Forces Special Weapons Project (AFSWP), and its descendant government organizations, from its original founding in 1947 to 1997. After the disestablishment of the Manhattan Engineering District (MED) in 1947, AFSWP was formed to provide military training in nuclear weapons' operations. Over the years, its sequential descendant organizations have been the Defense Atomic Support Agency (DASA) from 1959 to 1971, the Defense Nuclear Agency (DNA) from 1971 to 1996, and the Defense Special Weapons Agency (DSWA) from 1996 to 1998. In 1998, DSWA, the On-Site Inspection Agency, the Defense Technology Security Administration, and selected elements of the Office of Secretary of Defense were combined to form the Defense Threat Reduction Agency (DTRA).

DTRA employs approximately 2,000 civilians and uniformed service members at more than a dozen permanent locations around the world. The majority of personnel are at DTRA headquarters at Fort Belvoir. Approximately 15% of the workforce is split between Kirtland Air Force Base and the White Sands Missile Range in New Mexico, and the Nevada National Security Site (formerly called the Nevada Test Site), where they do testing and support the U.S. military's nuclear mission. The remaining 15% of the workforce is  stationed at locations in Germany, Kazakhstan, Azerbaijan, Uzbekistan, Georgia, Ukraine, Armenia, Kenya, South Korea, Japan, and Singapore. DTRA also has liaisons with all of the U.S. military's Combatant Commands, the National Guard Bureau, the FBI and other U.S. government interagency partners.

In 2005, the Commander, United States Strategic Command (USSTRATCOM) was designated as the lead Combatant Command for the integration and synchronization of DoD's efforts in support of U.S. government "Combating WMD" objectives. It was at this time that the SCC-WMD was co-located with DTRA. The Combat Command designation was changed again in 2017, when responsibility was moved to U.S. Special Operations Command (USSOCOM).

In 2012, the SJFHQ-E was relocated to the DTRA/SCC-WMD headquarters at Fort Belvoir. This centralized the DoD's Combating Weapons of Mass Destruction operations, a move recommended in the 2010 Quadrennial Defense Review.

On September 30, 2016, the Joint Improvised-Threat Defeat Agency (JIDA) became part of DTRA and was renamed the Joint Improvised-Threat Defeat Organization (JIDO) in accordance with the 2016 National Defense Authorization Act (NDAA). In Section 1532 of the NDAA, Congress directed the DoD to move JIDA to a military department or under an existing defense agency.

DTRA requested a base budget of $1.2 billion for fiscal year 2017 (FY17). The three other components of DTRA's overall resource portfolio include executing the $361 million Science and Technology portion of the DoD Chemical and Biological Defense Program (CBDP); managing the CBDP's remaining $833 million budget; and $408 million in overseas contingency operations funds requested by the JIDA (now JIDO). These additional amounts bring DTRA's total resource portfolio to approximately $2.8 billion for FY17.

Responsibilities

Destruction of Soviet arms

After the end of the Cold War, DTRA and its predecessor agencies implemented the DoD aspects of several treaties that assist former Eastern Bloc countries in the destruction of Soviet era nuclear weapons sites (such as missile silos and plutonium production facilities), biological weapons sites (such as the Soviet biological weapons program), and chemical weapons sites (such as the GosNIIOKhT) in an attempt to avert potential weapons proliferation in the post-Soviet era as part of the Nunn–Lugar Cooperative Threat Reduction program.

Other treaty responsibilities
DTRA is responsible for US reporting under the New START Treaty and the Intermediate-Range Nuclear Forces Treaty.

DTRA is also responsible for reducing the threat of conventional war, especially in Europe, by participating in various arms control treaties to which the United States is a party, such as the Conventional Forces in Europe treaty, the Treaty on Open Skies, the Transparency in Armaments activity of the United Nations, and the Wassenaar Arrangement, as well as the Vienna Document and the Global Exchange of Military Information program under the auspices of the Organization for Security and Co-operation in Europe.

On January 26, 2006, the director of DTRA was given the extra responsibility of the director of the USSTRATCOM Center for Combating Weapons of Mass Destruction, a subordinate component to the U.S. Strategic Command.

Domestic chemical and biological management
DTRA has the responsibility to manage and integrate the Department of Defense chemical and biological defense science and technology programs. In accordance with the Recommendation 174 (h) of the 2005 Base Closure and Realignment Commission, part of the Chemical Biological Defense Research component of the DTRA was re-located to Edgewood Chemical Biological Center, Aberdeen Proving Ground, Maryland in 2011. This represented a move of about ten percent of the staff of the Chemical Biological Defense Research component of DTRA to Aberdeen Proving Ground; the rest of the staff remain at Fort Belvoir.

Notable missions, projects, and programs

Ebola (2003-2014)
DTRA has spent approximately $300 million on scientific R&D efforts since 2003 developing vaccines and therapeutic treatments against viral hemorrhagic fever, including Ebola. Starting in 2007, DTRA partnered with the National Institute of Allergy and Infectious Diseases (NIAID) of the United States Department of Health and Human Services and the United States Army Medical Research Institute of Infectious Diseases (USAMRIID) to fund research on the drug now called ZMapp, which has since been used on several patients.

DTRA also funded and managed the research on the EZ1 assay used to detect and diagnose the presence of the Ebola Zaire virus in humans. EZ1 was given Emergency Use Authorization by the Food and Drug Administration (FDA) in August 2014. DTRA first developed EZ1 as part of a 2011 "bio-preparedness initiative" for the United States Department of Defense to prepare for a possible Ebola outbreak. EZ1 was used to identify infected patients in West Africa.

The Nunn-Lugar Cooperative Threat Reduction program provided for the DTRA to award a $4 million contract to MRIGlobal to "configure, equip, deploy and staff two quick response mobile laboratory systems (MLS) to support the ongoing Ebola outbreak in West Africa." The labs were deployed to Sierra Leone.

Transport Isolation System (2014)

DTRA was the program manager for designing, testing, contracting, and production of the Transport Isolation System (TIS), a sealed, self-contained patient containment system that can be loaded into United States Air Force C-17 Globemaster and C-130 Hercules cargo planes for aeromedical evacuation. The TIS was designed to deal with any U.S. troops exposed to or infected with Ebola while serving in Operation United Assistance, but it is for transporting anyone exposed to or infected with any highly contagious disease. It can hold eight patients laying down, 12 sitting, or a combination of the two. DTRA worked with the Air Force Life Cycle Management Center (AFLCMC) and United States Transportation Command (USTRANSCOM) on the TIS; St. Louis-based Production Products was awarded a sole-source contract to produce 25 TIS units.

Syria's chemical weapons (2014) 
DTRA was one of the key United States Department of Defense agencies that developed the Field Deployable Hydrolysis System (FDHS) used to destroy Syria's chemical weapons aboard the U.S.-flagged container ship MV Cape Ray in the summer of 2014 after Syria agreed to give up its chemical weapons stockpile under international pressure and in accordance with United Nations Security Council Resolution 2118. DTRA partnered with the United States Army Edgewood Chemical Biological Center (ECBC) to develop the FDHS and then modify it for ship-borne operations after Syrian President Bashar al-Assad agreed to turn over his country's poison gas arsenal and chemical weapon production equipment to the Organisation for the Prohibition of Chemical Weapons (OPCW) but no country volunteered to host the destruction process.

Two FDHS units destroyed more than 600 tons of Sarin and mustard agents, completing the task several weeks ahead of schedule. The remaining materials were then taken to Finland and Germany for final disposal. DTRA was awarded its third Joint Meritorious Unit Award for successfully destroying Syria's declared chemical weapons.

Massive Ordnance Penetrator (to 2010) 
DTRA funded, managed, and tested the Massive Ordnance Penetrator (MOP) bomb until February 2010 when the program was turned over to the United States Air Force. DTRA developed the MOP to fulfill a long-standing Air Force requirement for a weapon that could destroy hard and deeply buried targets. The MOP is a 30,000 pound, 20.5 foot long bomb dropped from B-52 and B-2 bombers at high altitude that can reportedly penetrate 200 feet of reinforced concrete. The MOP contains a 5,300 pound explosive charge, more than 10 times the explosive power of its predecessor, the BLU-109 "bunker buster."

Project MAXIMUS (to 2003) 
In 2003, a DTRA task force was identifying, collecting, and securing radiological material in Iraq as part of Operation Iraqi Freedom, including almost two tons of low enriched uranium (LEU), several hundred tons of yellowcake (a type of uranium powder), and other radioactive sources. Code-named Project MAXIMUS, DTRA, and the United States Department of Energy moved 1.77 metric tons of LEU and approximately 1,000 highly radioactive sources out of Iraq by the summer of 2004. DTRA task force members also secured the yellowcake in a bunker in Tuwaitha, Iraq, which was turned over to the Iraqi Ministry of Science and Technology; the remaining 550 tons of yellowcake were sold in 2008 to Cameco, a uranium producer in Canada.

COVID-19 

In late 2019, DTRA established a program called Discovery of Medical Countermeasures Against Novel Entities (DOMANE). Shortly afterwards, the COVID-19 pandemic began, and DOMANE started researching existing, pre-approved medications like Pepcid (famotidine) for potential cost-effective treatments for COVID-19.

Awards and official recognition

Joint Meritorious Unit Award 
DTRA and its legacy agencies have been awarded numerous Joint Meritorious Unit Awards (JMUA) since the JMUA was implemented in 1982 (made retroactive to 1979):

Defense Nuclear Agency
1st JMUA: 1 July 1981 – 20 June 1984
2nd JMUA: 1 January 1993 – 31 May 1995

On-Site Inspection Agency
1st JMUA: 15 January 1988 – 31 December 1988
2nd JMUA: 1 January 1989 – 30 July 1993
3rd JMUA: 1 August 1993 – 31 July 1996
4th JMUA: 1998

Defense Special Weapons Agency
1st JMUA: 1 June 1995 – 30 September 1998

Defense Threat Reduction Agency
1st JMUA: 1 October 1998 – 5 March 2000
2nd JMUA: 6 March 2000 – 30 June 2003
3rd JMUA: 1 October 2009 – 20 September 2011
4th JMUA: 1 May 2012 – 1 November 2014

Directors 

Jay C. Davis (1998–2001)
Robert P. Bongiovi (2001, acting)
Stephen M. Younger (2001–2004)
Trudy H. Clark (2004–2005, acting)
James A. Tegnelia (2005-2009)
Kenneth A. Myers III (2008–2016)
Shari Durand (2016-2017, acting)
 Michael L. Bruhn (2017, acting)
Vayl S. Oxford (2017–2021)
Dr. Rhys M. Williams (2021–2022, Acting)
Rebecca Hersman (2022-Present)

See also 
 National Counterproliferation Center
 Defense Treaty Ready Inspection Readiness Program

References

External links 
 DTRA, the official web site of the Defense Threat Reduction Agency
 Responding to War, Terrorism, and WMD Proliferation: History of DTRA, 1998–2008, DTRA History Series
 Defense's Nuclear Agency, 1947–1997, DTRA History Series
 Defense's Nuclear Agency, 1947–1997, DTRA History Series
 Defense Special Weapons Agency 50th Anniversary, 1947–1997, DTRA History Series

Government agencies established in 1998
Nuclear proliferation
Threat Reduction Agency
United States and weapons of mass destruction
Defense Threat Reduction Agency